Lord Ernest William Hamilton (5 September 1858 – 14 December 1939) was a United Kingdom soldier and Conservative politician who sat in the House of Commons from 1885 to 1892.

Hamilton was the seventh son of James Hamilton, 1st Duke of Abercorn and his wife Lady Louisa Jane Russell. He was educated at Harrow School and Royal Military College, Sandhurst. He became a captain in the 11th Hussars.
  
His elder brothers Lord George Hamilton, Lord James Hamilton, and Lord Frederick Hamilton were also Conservative MPs.
In the 1885 general election Hamilton was elected Member of Parliament for Tyrone North. He held the seat until 1892.

Hamilton was the author of several novels, two of which  – The Outlaws of the Marches and The Mawkin of the Flow – are set on the Scottish Borders in the late sixteenth and early seventeenth centuries.   Another novel, Mary Hamilton, is based on the ballad of the same name.

In the period after the First World War Hamilton published several historical works, notably The Soul of Ulster, arguing that Ulster Protestants are descended from Scottish Border Reivers transplanted to Ulster by James I and VI, and equating the 1641 massacre of planters by Irish Catholic rebels with later Irish nationalist movements.

In the 1920s Hamilton supported the British Fascists led by Rotha Lintorn-Orman, but he resigned from the movement when Lintorn-Orman refused to co-operate with the Conservative government in resisting the 1926 general strike.

Hamilton was brought up as an Evangelical Anglican.  His religious views are expressed in Involution, a book which denounces the theological concept of sacrificial atonement and argues that Jesus was a purely ethical teacher. Hamilton argues that Marcionism was the correct interpretation of Jesus' message and that the God of the Old Testament is a personification of the Jewish national character, which he describes in highly anti-semitic terms.

Hamilton married Pamela Campbell (d. 1931) in 1891. She was a granddaughter of Sir Guy Campbell, 1st Baronet by his son Capt. Frederick Augustus Campbell (1839–1916). They had two sons and two daughters:
 Guy Ernest Frederick Hamilton (1894–1914), who died unmarried.
 Mary Brenda Hamilton (1897–1985), who in 1922 married the Lt.-Col. of the Scots Guards, Alphonse de Chimay, Prince de Chimay, Comte de Caraman (d. 1973). Their only child and daughter was the widow of Hugh Seymour, 8th Marquess of Hertford.
 Jean Barbara Hamilton (b. 1898), who in 1921 became the first wife of Sir John Buchanan-Jardine, 3rd Baronet (1900–1969). They were divorced in 1944 and had one son.
 John George Peter Hamilton (1900–1967), who in 1932 married Alexandra Christine Egerton (d. 1963), daughter of William Egerton from Kimberley, South Africa. They had no issue.

Ancestry

References

External links 
 
 

1858 births
1939 deaths
11th Hussars officers
Graduates of the Royal Military College, Sandhurst
Members of the Parliament of the United Kingdom for County Tyrone constituencies (1801–1922)
People educated at Harrow School
Younger sons of dukes
UK MPs 1885–1886
UK MPs 1886–1892
British fascists
Irish Conservative Party MPs